Windhand / Satan's Satyrs is a 2018 split extended play (EP) by American bands Windhand and Satan's Satyrs.

Release
Windhand / Satan's Satyrs was released on February 16 on vinyl, compact disc and as a digital download. This split EP peaked at 11 on the Top Heatseekers on its release.

Following its release, Satan's Satyrs and Windhand played a record release show on together on March 23, 2018, in Richmond, Virginia.

Reception

James Christopher Monger of AllMusic declared that the EP "delivers enough wattage to power the East Coast through a category five hurricane.", and declared Satan's Satyrs song "Succubus" was a highlight that "grooves as hard as it spanks." Brayden Turenne of Exclaim! noted that "despite its power" the song "Three Sisters" by Windhand "can feel over-long toward the end" noting that it does not change much from how it initially starts.

Track listing
Track listing adapted liner notes.
 Windhand – "Old Evil"	
 Windhand – "Three Sisters"	
 Satan's Satyrs – "Alucard A.D. 2018"	
 Satan's Satyrs – "Succubus"	
 Satan's Satyrs – "Ain't That Lovin' You, Baby"

Credits
Credits adapted from liner notes.
 Parker Chandler – bass (on 1, 2)
 Dorthia Cottrell – vocals (on 1, 2)
 Garrett Morris – guitar (on 1, 2)
 Ryan Wolfe – drums (on 1, 2)
 Jonathan Kassalow – keyboards (on 1, 2)
 Clayton Burgess – bass, vocals, mixing (on 3, 4, 5)
 Jarrett Nettnin – guitar (on 3, 4, 5)
 Nate Towle – guitar (on 3, 4, 5)
 Stephen Fairfield – drums (on 3, 4, 5)
 Garrett Morris – recording and mixing
 Brad Boatright – mastering
 Orion Landau – artwork

References

2018 EPs
Relapse Records EPs
Windhand EPs
Satan's Satyrs EPs
Split EPs